American singer Harry Connick Jr. has released 26 albums, including 21 albums on Sony, three albums on the Marsalis Music label, and one each on Adco Productions and on Papa's-June Music.

His best-selling album to date (August 2009) in the United States is his 1993 multi-platinum Christmas album When My Heart Finds Christmas, which is also one of the best-selling Christmas albums of the Nielsen SoundScan era in the United States. His highest-charting album to date is Only You, which reached #5 in the US and #6 in the UK.

Connick has had the most No. 1 albums (11) on the Billboard Top Jazz Albums chart. He has sold over 15 million albums in the US (16 million certified).

Albums
U.S. certification information is from RIAA, Canadian certification information from CRIA, Australian certification information from ARIA, French certification information from SNEP, U.S. chart positions are from Allmusic and Billboard.

Vocal albums

Instrumental albums

Live albums

Soundtracks and cast albums

Soundtrack appearances
 1991 The Godfather Part III / Carmine Coppola#12 "Promise Me You'll Remember"
 1993 Sleepless in Seattle / Various Artists#8 "A Wink and a Smile"
 1994 The Mask / Various Artists#5 "(I Could Only) Whisper Your Name" 
 1996 One Fine Day / Various Artists#11 "This Guy's in Love with You"
 1998 Kissing a Fool / Various Artists"Learn to Love" and "We Are in Love" (appears in the movie, not on the soundtrack)
 2001 South Pacific / Various Artists#9 "Younger than Springtime", #14 "You've Got to Be Carefully Taught" and #17 "My Girl Back Home"

Compilations

Various appearances
These tracks are not found on any of Connick's own albums.
 1989 Jubilation / Various Artists#7 "You Go to My Head" 
 1990 A Jazzy Wonderland / Various Artists#1 "This Christmas"
 1990 Making Every Moment Count / Peter Allen#3 "When I Get My Name in Lights"
 1991 Simply Mad About the Mouse / Various Artists#6 "The Bare Necessities" 
 1998 New Orleans... My Home Town / Harry Connick Sr.#2 "Rocky Mountain Moon"
 1999 And So This Is Christmas / Various Artists"Silver Bells" 
 1999 My Jelly Lord:  Standard Time Vol. Six / Wynton Marsalis#12 "Billy Goat Stomp"
 2002 The Season for Romance / Lee Ann Womack & Harry Connick Jr. (duet)"Baby, It's Cold Outside"
 2002 A Jazz Celebration / The Marsalis Family#10 "Saint James Infirmary"
 2003 Romare Bearden Revealed / Branford Marsalis Quartet#9 "Carolina Shout"
 2007 Marsalis Music Honors Series: Bob French / Bob FrenchSitting in on piano
 2008 Wonder in the World / Kelli O'Hara - arranged and orchestrated by Connick, three tracks written by Connick, plays piano on 12 of the 14 tracks, and sings a duet with O'Hara.
 2010 Music Redeems / The Marsalis Family#7 "Sweet Georgia Brown"

DVDs

See also
Songs recorded by Harry Connick Jr.

References

Discography
Vocal jazz discographies
Pop music discographies
Discographies of American artists